Russian Symphony ( Russkaya simfoniya) is a 1994 Russian psychological drama film directed by Konstantin Lopushansky and starring Viktor Mikhaylov. The narrative is set in a dark version of contemporary Russia where the world seems to be coming to an end through a flood. A man is desperate to do something good with his life before it ends, but is mostly met with suspicion.

The film ties in thematically with Lopushansky's other apocalyptic films, Dead Man's Letters (1986), A Visitor to a Museum (1989) and The Ugly Swans (2006), and is the most overtly religious of them.

It played in the Forum section of the 45th Berlin International Film Festival and received the Prize of the Ecumenical Jury.

Cast
 Viktor Mikhaylov as Ivan Sergeyevich Mazayev
 Aleksandr Ilyin as Sanya
 Kira Kreylis-Petrova as Valentina Ivanovna Mazdukhina
 Valentina Kovel as Semyonovna
 Mikhail Khrabrov as General
Valentin Golubenko as Giliuli
 Natalya Akimova as Teacher
 Nora Gryakalova as Teacher
 Aleksey Ingelevich
 Nikolai Levykin as Mikhail Gorbachev
 Valery Garkalin as Borisych
Andrey Krasko as Cossack

References

External links 
 

1994 films
1994 drama films
1990s psychological drama films
1990s fantasy drama films
Christian apocalyptic films
Cultural depictions of Mikhail Gorbachev
Films directed by Konstantin Lopushansky
Russian fantasy drama films
Russian dystopian films
1990s Russian-language films
Lenfilm films